Hayato Yuge (弓削 隼人, (born April 6, 1994) is a Japanese professional baseball pitcher for the Tohoku Rakuten Golden Eagles in Japan's Nippon Professional Baseball (NBP). He made his NPB debut in 2019.

External links

NPB stats

1994 births
Living people
Japanese baseball players
Nippon Professional Baseball pitchers
Tohoku Rakuten Golden Eagles players
Baseball people from Tochigi Prefecture